Andrew Green (born 1970) is a male retired boxer who competed for England at the commonwealth games.

Boxing career
Green was the National Champion in 1994 after winning the prestigious ABA lightweight title, boxing out of the Phil Thomas School of Boxing ABC.

He represented England in the lightweight (-60 Kg) division, at the 1994 Commonwealth Games in Victoria, British Columbia, Canada.

He turned professional on 22 February 1996 and fought in 9 fights until 1999.

References

1970 births
English male boxers
Boxers at the 1994 Commonwealth Games
Living people
Lightweight boxers
Commonwealth Games competitors for England